Woman River station is a Via Rail flag stop station located in Woman River, Ontario, Canada on the Sudbury – White River train.

References

Via Rail stations in Ontario
Railway stations in Sudbury District